The Begna is a river in Viken and Innlandet counties in Norway. Along its course, the river passes through the village of Begna in Sør-Aurdal Municipality. The Norwegian writer, Mikkjel Fønhus lived much of his life and located most of his novels along the river Begna.

Course
The headwaters of the river is found in the Filefjell mountain plateau on the south side of the Jotunheimen mountains. Many of the mountain streams that feed into the river flow into the lake Otrøvatnet. The main outflow of the lake is where the river Begna begins. This part is also known as the Otrøelva river, and a short distance downstream the river Ylja joins it and after this confluence, the river is known as the Begna. The river continues eastwards and southwards along its course. 

There are several places along the river which have been dammed and these have formed a number of large lakes including Vangsmjøse, Slidrefjorden, Strondafjorden, and Aurdalsfjorden. The valley through which the river flows is called the Begnadalen valley. After passing through the village of Begna, the river enters into Viken county. After passing the village of Nes, the river enters the large lake Sperillen in the Ådal valley. From the lake Sperillen to the town of Hønefoss, the river is also known as the Ådalselva. The river Begna joins the Randselva river in Hønefoss before discharging into the large lake Tyrifjorden.

Power generation
In the past, the river Begna was a significant log driving river. The largest power stations are Åbjøra in Nord-Aurdal which produces  and Bagn in Sør-Aurdal which produces . The Association for Begna Watershed Control is an association that was created under the provisions of the Norwegian Watercourse Act. Its purpose is to protect members' common interests with regard to the use of water from the Begna river basin that is used for power generation. The hydropower company operates 20 power plants on the Begna (and the river Drammenselva which flows from the lake Tyrifjorden to the sea. The association is responsible for maintenance and operation of dams, gates, and stations along the Begna waterway. The plants are mainly located in Valdres in the upper part of the river.

See also
List of rivers in Norway

References

Rivers of Viken
Rivers of Innlandet
Valdres
Rivers of Norway